Laboratory animal suppliers in the United Kingdom breed animals such as rodents, rabbits, dogs, cats and primates which they sell to licensed establishments for scientific experimentation. Many have found themselves at the centre of animal rights protests against animal testing.

Campaign methods have included leafleting, demonstrations, verbal and physical intimidation, false accusations of criminal activity such as paedophilia, destruction of property, arson, the use of explosive devices and a grave-robbing.

Many smaller breeders have gone out of business, concentrating the market around larger international companies, such as Charles River Laboratories and Harlan, or to forcing pharmaceutical companies and universities to breed animals in-house. For example, after Shamrock Farm closed in 2000, there were no commercial importers of laboratory primates left in the UK. To address this shortage, Cambridge University planned to build Europe's largest primate facility. However, they withdrew their plans following a concerted campaign by animal rights activists.

The trend has been for companies that experiment on animals to threaten to pull out of the UK. The chief executive of GlaxoSmithKline, Jean-Pierre Garnier has said: "I work hard to bring in investment to the United Kingdom and have talked many times to friends who are in the pharmaceutical and biotechnology businesses about moving here. But there is one issue that exists only in the UK and nowhere else has a comparative effect from extreme actions by animal rights activists."

References

Animal testing in the United Kingdom
Animal suppliers